= Ruby's Pantry =

Former Minnesotan food pantry network

Ruby's Pantry was a Minnesota-based food pantry network that operated from 2003 to 2026. On April 1, 2026, it permanently closed all of its operations including 80 locations in Minnesota, Wisconsin, Iowa, and North Dakota. It stated that its operation was no longer financially sustainable due to rising operational expenses such as fuel, truck repairs, and insurance.
